The Department of Arts and Culture was until 2019 a department of the South African government. It was responsible for promoting, supporting, developing and protecting the arts, culture and heritage of South Africa. The heritage sites, museums and monuments of the country also resided under this ministry. The political head of the department was the Minister of Arts and Culture. In June 2019 the department was merged with Sport and Recreation South Africa to form a new Department of Sports, Arts and Culture.

See also 
 Culture minister
 Ministry for Culture and Heritage of New Zealand

References

External links 

 Department of Arts and Culture

Arts and Culture
South African culture
South Africa